The Equatorial Guinea national under-16 and basketball team is a national basketball team of Equatorial Guinea, governed by Feguibasket.
It represents the country in international under-16 (under age 16) basketball competitions.

See also
Equatorial Guinea men's national basketball team

References

External links
Archived records of Equatorial Guinea team participations

Basketball teams in Equatorial Guinea
Men's national under-16 basketball teams
Basketball